Longbush is a rural community in the Carterton District, Wairarapa (within the Wellington Region) of New Zealand's North Island.  It is located in a valley southeast of the town of Carterton, and nearby settlements include Gladstone and Ponatahi to the north.

Longbush was established as a settlement in 1902, under the Land For Settlements Consolidation Act 1900, at the same time as nearby Table-lands.  Together Longbush and Table-lands had a combined land area of 27,000 acres.  In 1904, an application for a school was approved by the Education Board, it opened in 1905.  The school closed in 1968 and consolidated with nearby Gladstone School.  Today the school is used as a children's play centre and occasional community hall.

The Longbush area includes a valley enclosed by the Ponatahi Hills to the west and the slopes at the southern end of the Maungaraki Range that skirt around the back of the Windy Peak Ridge. The hill/valley area is a transitional area between the plains and the more rugged hill country to the east. The Gladstone, Central Plains and Martinborough areas wrap around the north and west sides of the Longbush area and the Hinakura, Tuturumuri, and Huangarua areas bound the eastern and southern sides.

Longbush has a small resident population (<200) composed mostly of pastoral farmers (sheep, diary, beef, pig and deer), agricultural workers, and lifestylers. The local hapū is Ngāti Hikawera, part of the Ngāti Kahungunu iwi.

Notable people
Hamuera Tamahau Mahupuku (c.1842 – 14 January 1904), a New Zealand tribal leader, runholder, assessor, and newspaper proprietor.  Mahupuku Road, Longbush, is named after him.

Events 
A small number of local annual events take place, including:

 November: Wairarapa Garden Tour that local Longbush Cottage participates in.
 November: Scarecrow's Big Day Out.
 Wednesday mornings: Longbush playgroup

Historical notes 

 April 1908, local flax mill closes after a year of operation due to increasing labour costs
 May 1908, the road from Longbush to Martinborough opened with the completion of the last bridge.
 December 1908, first telephone sub-exchanges are agreed to be installed.
 September 1909, a cheese factory opens, in 1915 Longbush cheese was shipped from Carterton to London.

References

Populated places in the Wellington Region
Carterton District
Carterton, New Zealand
Wairarapa